Cervignano-Aquileia-Grado is a railway station serving the town of Cervignano del Friuli, in the region of Friuli-Venezia Giulia, northern Italy. The station opened on 11 June 1894 and is located on the Venice–Trieste railway and Udine-Cervignano railway. The train services are operated by Trenitalia.

History
Between 1910 and 1937, the station was the terminus of the Cervignano-Aquileia-Pontile per Grado railway. In 1937 with the termination of the service on the short line to Grado, the station assumed its present name, Cervignano-Aquileia-Grado, which refers to two major tourist areas. The station was known as Cervignano del Friuli until 1937.

Train services
The station is served by the following service(s):

High speed services (Frecciarossa) Turin - Milan - Verona - Padua - Venice - Trieste
Intercity services Rome - Florence - Bologna - Padua - Venice - Trieste
Express services (Regionale Veloce) Venice - Portogruaro - Cervignano del Friuli - Trieste
Regional services (Treno regionale) Tarvisio - Carnia - Gemona del Friuli - Udine - Cervignano del Friuli - Trieste

Bus services
Buses supplement train services between Cervignano, Palmanova and Udine.

See also

History of rail transport in Italy
List of railway stations in Friuli-Venezia Giulia
Rail transport in Italy
Railway stations in Italy

References

 This article is based upon a translation of the Italian language version as of January 2016.

External links

Railway stations in Friuli-Venezia Giulia